A total solar eclipse occurred on Thursday, May 29, 1919. With the duration of totality at maximum eclipse of 6 minutes 50.75 seconds, it was the longest solar eclipse since May 27, 1416. A longer total solar eclipse would later occur on June 8, 1937.

As it occurred only 0.8 days after perigee (May 28), the Moon's apparent diameter was larger.

It was visible throughout most of South America and Africa as a partial eclipse. Totality occurred through a narrow path across southeastern Peru, northern Chile, central Bolivia and Brazil after sunrise, across the Atlantic Ocean and into south central Africa, covering southern Liberia, southern French West Africa (the part now belonging to Ivory Coast), southwestern tip of British Gold Coast (now Ghana), Príncipe Island in Portuguese São Tomé and Príncipe, southern Spanish Guinea (now Equatorial Guinea), French Equatorial Africa (the parts now belonging to Gabon and R. Congo, including Libreville), Belgian Congo (now DR Congo), northeastern Northern Rhodesia (now Zambia), northern tip of Nyasaland (now Malawi), German East Africa (now belonging to Tanzania) and northeastern Portuguese Mozambique (now Mozambique), ending near sunset in eastern Africa. There was another solar eclipse in 1919, an annular solar eclipse on November 22.

Observations

Albert Einstein's prediction of the bending of light by the gravity of the Sun, one of the components of his general theory of relativity, can be tested during a solar eclipse, when stars with apparent position near the sun become visible. Following an unsuccessful attempt to validate this prediction during the Solar eclipse of June 8, 1918, two expeditions were made to measure positions of stars during this eclipse (see Eddington experiment). They were organized under the direction of Sir Frank Watson Dyson. The first was led by Sir Arthur Eddington to the island of Príncipe (off the west coast of Africa), the second by Andrew Claude de la Cherois Crommelin and Charles Rundle Davidson to Sobral in Brazil. The stars that both expeditions observed were in the constellation Taurus.

Related eclipses

Solar eclipses 1916–1920

Saros 136

Inex series

Notes

References
 NASA chart and statistics
 Fotos of Solar Corona May 29, 1919
 Wired.com: May 29, 1919: A Major Eclipse, Relatively Speaking
 Famous Eclipse of 1919

1919 in science
1919 05 29
Príncipe
Tests of general relativity
Articles containing video clips
May 1919 events